Kevin Robinson may refer to:

 Kevin Robinson (gridiron football) (born 1984), wide receiver
 Kevin Robinson (hurler) (born 1955), Irish hurler
 Kevin Robinson (BMX rider) (1971–2017), American BMX rider